Amt Neuzelle is an Amt ("collective municipality") in the district of Oder-Spree, in Brandenburg, Germany. Its seat is in Neuzelle.

The Amt Neuzelle consists of the following municipalities:
Lawitz
Neißemünde
Neuzelle

Demography

References

Neuzelle
Oder-Spree